The American Elm cultivar Ulmus americana 'Delaware' was originally selected (as tree number 218, a c.1940 seedling from North Dakota) from 35,000 seedlings inoculated with the Dutch elm disease fungus in USDA trials at Morristown, New Jersey.

Description

The tree has a relatively low stature and "undesirable" branching habit.

Pests and diseases
Further disease-resistance trials were conducted by both the USDA and the United States National Arboretum which confirmed the clone had a fair level of resistance to Dutch elm disease. 'Delaware' is susceptible to Elm Yellows, but resistant to the Elm Leaf Beetle Xanthogaleruca luteola.

Cultivation
The original tree, which had been moved to the USDA National Arboretum, Washington, D. C. in 1948, died from unknown causes (probably elm yellows, by some accounts) in 1980, but a clone survives at the Denver Botanic Gardens, as 'Delaware II'. Seven specimens stand in the National Mall area, Washington D.C.  Although propagated for further trials, the tree was never commercially released owing to its poor shape. 'Delaware' is not known to have been introduced to Europe or Australasia.

Synonymy
'Delaware II'.
NB 'Delaware I' is the original name given to the hybrid 'Urban' before its commercial release.

Accessions

North America
Brooklyn Botanic Garden, New York, US. Acc. no. 980489.
Dawes Arboretum, US. , Newark, Ohio, US. 1 tree, listed as 'Delaware #2'; no acc. details available.
Denver Botanic Gardens, US. No details available.
Dominion Arboretum, Canada. . No details available.

References

American elm cultivar
Ulmus articles with images
Ulmus